Cheng Jiao (born 28 April 1994) is a Chinese Paralympian swimmer who won three gold medals in Swimming at the 2016 Summer Paralympics: at the Women's 50 metre backstroke S4 event with 48.11, at the Women's 50 metre breaststroke SB3 event with 58.28, and at the Women's 150 metre individual medley SM4 event with 2:49.69.

References

External links 
 

1994 births
Living people
Chinese female medley swimmers
Chinese female backstroke swimmers
Chinese female breaststroke swimmers
Chinese female freestyle swimmers
Paralympic swimmers of China
Paralympic gold medalists for China
Paralympic silver medalists for China
Swimmers at the 2016 Summer Paralympics
Swimmers at the 2020 Summer Paralympics
Medalists at the 2016 Summer Paralympics
Medalists at the 2020 Summer Paralympics
Paralympic medalists in swimming
S4-classified Paralympic swimmers
21st-century Chinese women
Medalists at the 2018 Asian Para Games